Fedagh Rural District is a rural district (dehestan) in the Central District of Gerash County, Fars Province, Iran. At the 2016 census, its population was 8,689 in 1,992 families.  The rural district has 24 villages.

References 

Rural Districts of Fars Province
Gerash County